Walhorn is a village in the municipality of Lontzen, East Belgium.

The HSL 3 passes immediately next to Walhorn.

External links
 
Official website Tourist information Walhorn

Lontzen
Former municipalities of the German-speaking Community